Thomas Cricklade or Crekkelade (died c. 1449) was the member of Parliament for Cricklade for the parliaments of May 1413, December 1421, and 1422. He was also the member for Calne in 1426.

References 

Year of birth missing
English MPs May 1413
Members of the Parliament of England (pre-1707) for Cricklade
1449 deaths
Members of Parliament for Calne
English MPs December 1421
English MPs 1422
English MPs 1426